HMS Pegasus was a 14-gun ship sloop of the , launched on 27 December 1776.  She was commissioned the same month under Commander John Hamilton Gore and - after completing on 3 March 1777 - sailed for Newfoundland on 3 April. She was lost with all hands in a storm off Newfoundland in October.

References
 
 Winfield, Rif, British Warships in the Age of Sail 1714-1792: Design, Construction, Careers and Fates. Seaforth Publishing, 2007. .

External links
 

Sloops of the Royal Navy
1776 ships
Swan-class ship-sloops